Dr. Lewis S. Owings (September 6, 1820 – August 20, 1875) was an American politician, physician, and businessman from Tennessee who served as the 2nd Governor of Arizona Territory (Confederate), in exile, from 1862 to 1865. He had previously served as provisional governor of Arizona Territory from 1860 to 1861.

Early life 
Born in Roane County, Tennessee, Owings went to Yell County, Arkansas and then to Texas, where he helped found the town of Helena, serving as the first postmaster. In 1855, he served in the Texas House of Representatives but was defeated for reelection moving to Mesilla, New Mexico, where he had a mine.

Political career 
In 1860 Owings was chosen as Provisional Governor of "Arizona Territory"—a region including New Mexico and Arizona—in an organization convention at Tucson. The Convention subsequently petitioned the United States Congress for recognition of their government, but the impending conflicts of the American Civil War in the east distracted Washington's attention away from what was then a remote frontier outpost. Owings nevertheless proceeded to carry out the official functions of a de facto governor in the largely unorganized territory and established three militia companies to protect residents from Indian raids and border smugglers.

Owings held the post until August 1, 1861, when the Arizona Territory was formally reorganized by the Confederacy and declared south of the 34th Parallel by Lieutenant Colonel John R. Baylor, who then assumed the governorship. In 1862, following Baylor's ouster and the Confederate retreat from the territory following the Union victory at Glorietta Pass, Owings was again appointed Governor of the territory and held the office in exile in San Antonio until the end of the Civil War.

Later life 
After the American Civil War, Owings went to Kansas briefly and then settled in Denison, Texas, serving briefly as mayor.

References

Further reading 
In Old Arizona: True Tales from the Wild Frontier (1985) by Marshall Trimble

External links 

 

1820 births
1875 deaths
19th-century American businesspeople
19th-century American physicians
19th-century American politicians
Governors of Arizona Territory
Burials in Texas
Businesspeople from Tennessee
Exiled politicians
Mayors of places in Texas
Members of the Texas House of Representatives
People of Arizona in the American Civil War
People from Roane County, Tennessee
Physicians from Tennessee